Hilo is a moku or district on the Big Island of Hawaiʻi in the State of Hawaii, U.S.A. In the current system of administration of Hawaiʻi County, the moku of Hilo is divided into North Hilo District (Hilo ‘Akau) and South Hilo District (Hilo Hema). 

Hilo is located on the eastern, windward side of the island, enjoying abundance of rainfall, and therefore includes the island's most populated town, also called Hilo.

North Hilo District 
In the District of North Hilo, there are, along Hawaii State Highway 19 from north to south, the following unincorporated towns and localities:
 ʻŌʻōkala
 Laupāhoehoe and the Train Museum 
 Ninole
and others. Inland, along State Highway 200, are:
 Mauna Kea mountain road and Puu Huluhulu
and others.

South Hilo District 
In the District of South Hilo, there are, along State Highway 19, the following unincorporated towns and localities:
 Honomu and the Akaka Falls
 Pepeekeo
 Wainaku
 Hilo Bay, the Wailuku River and the Rainbow Falls
 Hilo downtown: Pacific Tsunami Museum, Hawaii Community Correctional Center, etc.
Along State Highway 11, are:
 Hilo International Airport
 King Kuhio Shopping Center 
 Pana'ewa Rainforest Zoo
and others. Along State Highway 200 and its extension, are:
 Kaumana
 University of Hawaii at Hilo
 Puainako Shopping Center 
and others.

Gallery

References

External links

Districts of Hawaii County, Hawaii
Hilo District